Visrud (also Romanized as Vīsrūd) is a village in Chubar Rural District, Ahmadsargurab District, Shaft County, Gilan Province, Iran. At the 2006 census, its population was 1,148, in 305 families.

References 

Populated places in Shaft County